Mary Robinson (née Darby; 27 November 1757 – 26 December 1800) was an English actress, poet, dramatist, novelist, and celebrity figure. She lived in England, in the cities of Bristol and London; she also lived in France and Germany for a time. She enjoyed poetry from the age of seven and started working, first as a teacher and then as actress, from the age of fourteen. She wrote many plays, poems and novels. She was a celebrity, gossiped about in newspapers, famous for her acting and writing. During her lifetime she was known as "the English Sappho". She earned her nickname "Perdita" for her role as Perdita (heroine of Shakespeare's The Winter's Tale) in 1779. She was the first public mistress of King George IV while he was still Prince of Wales.

Biography

Early life
Robinson was born in Bristol, England to Nicholas Darby, a naval captain, and her wife Hester (née Vanacott) who had married at Donyatt, Somerset, in 1749, and was baptised 'Polle(y)' ("Spelt 'Polle' in the official register and 'Polly' in the Bishop's Transcript") at St Augustine's Church, Bristol, 19 July 1758, the entry noting that she was born 27 November 1756. In her memoirs, Robinson gives her birth in 1758, but the year 1757 seems more likely according to recently published research (see appendix to Byrne, 2005). Her father deserted her mother and took a mistress when Robinson was still a child. The family hoped for a reconciliation, but Captain Darby made it clear that this was not going to happen. Without the support of her husband, Hester Darby supported herself and the five children born of the marriage by starting a school for young girls in Little Chelsea, London, (where Robinson taught by her 14th birthday). However, during one of his brief returns to the family, Captain Darby had the school closed (which he was entitled to do by English law). Darby died in the Russian naval service in 1785. Robinson, who at one point attended a school run by the social reformer Hannah More, came to the attention of actor David Garrick.

Marriage
Hester Darby encouraged her daughter to accept the proposal of an articled clerk, Thomas Robinson, who claimed to have an inheritance. Mary was against this idea; however, after falling ill and watching him take care of her and her younger brother, she felt that she owed him, and she did not want to disappoint her mother who was pushing for the engagement. After the early marriage, Robinson discovered her husband did not have an inheritance. He continued to live an elaborate lifestyle, however, and made no effort to hide multiple affairs. Subsequently, Mary supported their family. After her husband squandered their money, the couple fled to Talgarth, Breconshire (where Robinson's only daughter, Mary Elizabeth, was born in November). Here they lived in a fairly large estate, called Tregunter Park. Eventually her husband was imprisoned for debt in the Fleet Prison where she lived with him for many months. While it was common for the wives of prisoners to live with their husbands while indebted, children were usually sent to live with relatives to keep them away from the dangers of prison. However, Robinson was deeply devoted to her daughter Maria, and when her husband was imprisoned, Robinson brought the 6-month-old baby with her.

It was in the Fleet Prison that Robinson's literary career really began, as she found that she could publish poetry to earn money, and to give her an escape from the harsh reality that had become her life. Her first book, Poems By Mrs. Robinson, was published in 1775 by C. Parker. Additionally, Robinson's husband was offered work in the form of copying legal documents so he could try to pay back some of his debts, but he refused to do anything. Robinson, in an effort to keep the family together and to get back to normal life outside of prison, took the job instead, collecting the pay that her husband neglected to earn. During this time, Mary Robinson found a patron in Georgiana Cavendish, Duchess of Devonshire, who sponsored the publication of Robinson's second volume of poems, Captivity.

Theatre

After her husband obtained his release from prison, Robinson decided to return to the theatre. She launched her acting career and took to the stage playing Juliet at Drury Lane Theatre in December 1776. Robinson was best known for her facility with the 'breeches parts', and her performances as Viola in William Shakespeare'sTwelfth Night and Rosalind in As You Like It won her extensive praise. But she gained popularity with playing in Florizel and Perdita, an adaptation of Shakespeare, with the role of Perdita (heroine of The Winter's Tale) in 1779. It was during this performance that she attracted the notice of the young Prince of Wales, later King George IV of the United Kingdom. He offered her twenty thousand pounds to become his mistress. During this time, the very young Emma, Lady Hamilton sometimes worked as her maid and dresser at the theatre.

With her new social prominence, Robinson became a trend-setter in London, introducing a loose, flowing muslin style of gown based upon Grecian statuary that became known as the Perdita. It took Robinson a considerable amount of time to decide to leave her husband for the Prince, as she did not want to be seen by the public as that type of woman. Throughout much of her life she struggled to live in the public eye and also to stay true to the values in which she believed. She eventually gave in to her desires to be with a man who she thought would treat her better than Mr Robinson. However the Prince ended the affair in 1781, refusing to pay the promised sum. "Perdita" Robinson was left to support herself through an annuity promised by the Crown (but rarely paid), in return for some letters written by the Prince, and through her writings. After her affair with the young Prince of Wales she became famous for her rides in her extravagant carriages and her celebrity–like perception by the public.

Later life and death 

Mary Robinson, who now lived separately from her husband, went on to have several love affairs, most notably with Banastre Tarleton, a soldier who had recently distinguished himself fighting in the American War of Independence. Prior to their relationship, Robinson had been having an affair with a man named Lord Malden. According to one account, Malden and Tarleton were betting men, and Malden was so confident in Robinson's loyalty to him, and believed that no man could ever take her from him. As such, he made a bet of a thousand guineas that none of the men in his circle could seduce her. Unfortunately for Malden, Tarleton accepted the bet and swooped in to not only seduce Robinson, but establish a relationship that would last the next 15 years. This relationship, though rumoured to have started on a bet, saw Tarleton's rise in military rank and his concomitant political successes, Mary's own various illnesses, financial vicissitudes and the efforts of Tarleton's own family to end the relationship. They had no children, although Robinson had a miscarriage. However, in the end, Tarleton married Susan Bertie, an heiress and an illegitimate daughter of the young 4th Duke of Ancaster, and niece of his sisters Lady Willoughby de Eresby and Lady Cholmondeley. In 1783, Robinson suffered a mysterious illness that left her partially paralysed. Biographer Paula Byrne speculates that a streptococcal infection resulting from a miscarriage led to a severe rheumatic fever that left her disabled for the rest of her life.

From the late 1780s, Robinson became distinguished for her poetry and was called "the English Sappho". In addition to poems, she wrote eight novels, three plays, feminist treatises, and an autobiographical manuscript that was incomplete at the time of her death. Like her contemporary Mary Wollstonecraft, she championed the rights of women and was an ardent supporter of the French Revolution. She died in poverty at Englefield Cottage, Englefield Green, Surrey, 26 December 1800, aged 44, having survived several years of ill health, and was survived by her daughter, Maria Elizabeth (1774-1818), who was also a published novelist. Administration of her estate was granted to her husband Thomas Robinson from whom she had long been separated and who in 1803 inherited a substantial estate from his half-brother William. One of Robinson's dying wishes was to see the rest of her works published. She tasked her daughter, Maria Robinson, with publishing most of these works. She also placed her Memoirs in the care of her daughter, insisting that she publish the work. Maria Robinson published Memoirs just a few months later.

Portraits 
During her lifetime, Robinson also enjoyed the distinction of having her image captured by the most notable artists of the period. The earliest known, drawn by James Roberts II, depicts "Mrs. Robinson in the Character of Amanda" from Cibber's Love's Last Shift in 1777. In 1781, Thomas Gainsborough produced an oil sketch, Mrs. Mary Robinson 'Perdita', and an untitled study. That year, George Romney also painted Mrs. Mary Robinson and John Keyse Sherwin printed an untitled portrait. Joshua Reynolds sketched a study for what became Portrait of a Lady in 1782, and in 1784, he finished Mrs Robinson as Contemplation for which he also sketched a study. George Dance the Younger sketched a later portrait in 1793.

Literature 

In 1792 Robinson published her most popular novel which was a Gothic novel titled, Vancenza; or The Dangers of Credulity. The books were "sold out by lunch time on the first day and five more editions quickly followed, making it one of the top-selling novels in the latter part of the eighteenth century." It did not receive either critical or popular acclaim. In 1794 she wrote The Widow; or, A Picture of Modern Times which portrayed themes of manners in the fashionable world. Since Robinson was a fashion icon and very much involved in the fashion world the novel did not get a lot of favourable reception in 1794 as it might have now. In 1796 she wrote Angelina: A Novel. It cost more money than it brought in. Through this novel, she offers her thoughts on the afterlife of her literary career.

There has been an increase in scholarly attention to Robinson’s literary output in recent years. While most of the early literature written about Robinson focused on her sexuality, emphasising her affairs and fashions, she also spoke out about woman's place in the literary world, for which she began to receive the attention of feminists and literary scholars in the 1990s. Robinson recognised that, ”women writers were deeply ambivalent about the myths of authorship their male counterparts had created” and as a result she sought to elevate woman's place in the literary world by recognising women writers in her own work. In A Letter to the Women of England, Robinson includes an entire page dedicated to English women writers to support her notion that they were just as capable as men of being successful in the literary world. These ideas have continued to keep Mary Robinson relevant in literary discussions today. In addition to maintaining literary and cultural notability, she has re-attained a degree of celebrity in recent years when several biographies of her appeared, including one by Paula Byrne entitled Perdita: The Literary, Theatrical, and Scandalous Life of Mary Robinson that became a top-ten best-seller after being selected for the Richard & Judy Book Club.

An eight-volume scholarly edition of Robinson's complete works was published in 2009–2010. In 2011, Daniel Robinson (no relation), editor of the poetry for the edition, published the first scholarly monograph to focus exclusively on her literary achievement--The Poetry of Mary Robinson: Form and Fame. A second monograph on Robinson's literary career, Mary Robinson and the Genesis of Romanticism: Literary Dialogues and Debts, 1784-1821, by Ashley Cross, appeared in 2016. Although, Robinson's novels were not as successful as she hoped, she had a talent for her poetry. Her ability to produce poetry can be seen furthermore in her poems titled "Sappho and Phaeon". Since the press had given her the name "The English Sappho", a clear relationship can be drawn between these poems and her literary name. The poems are love poems and many scholars have come to the conclusion that they represent her affairs with the Prince of Wales. Mary Darby Robinson was not only praised in literary circles for her poetry but also for her works written in prose. The two best known examples are "A Letter to the Women of England" (1798) and "The Natural Daughter" (1799). Both her works are dealing with the role of women during the Romantic Era. Mary Robinson as much as Mary Wollenstonecraft tried to put the focus on how inferior women were treated in comparison to men. The discrepancy can be seen in both of her works. "The Natural Daughter" can be seen as an autobiography of Mary Robinson. The characters are in many ways patterns of her own life and the stages of her life. All the characters are symbols of her own coming of age or people she met in her life.

Poetry 

From the late 1780s, Robinson, striving to separate herself from her past scandals, and life as a theatre actress, turned to writing as a full-time career. Robinson, disregarding her previous associations with the nickname “Perdita”, meaning “lost one”, soon became distinguished for her poetry and was reclassified as "the English Sappho" by the English public. During her 25-year writing career, from 1775 until her premature death in 1800, Robinson produced an immense body of work. In addition to eight collections of poems, Robinson wrote eight novels, three plays, feminist treatises, and an autobiographical manuscript that was incomplete at the time of her death.

Poems by Mrs. Robinson, was published by C. Parker, in London, in 1775. "Poems" consisted of “twenty-six ballads, odes, and elegies” that “echo traditional values, praising values such as charity, sincerity, and innocence, particularly in a woman”. Robinson's husband, Thomas Robinson was imprisoned at the King's Bench Prison for fifteen months for the gambling debts he acquired. Robinson originally intended for the profits made from this collection to help pay off his debts. But the publication of Poems could not prevent his imprisonment. Robinson lived for nine months and three weeks with Thomas and their baby within the squalor of prison.

Motivated by the months she spent in prison, Robinson wrote Captivity; a Poem and Celadon and Lydia, a Tale, published by T. Becket, in London, in 1777. This collection “described the horrors of captivity and painted a sympathetic picture of the ‘wretch’ and the ‘guiltless partners of his poignant woes’...The poem ends admonishing people to open their hearts and to pity the unfortunate...”
  
Following the publication of Captivity, Robinson established a new poetic identity for herself. Robinson let go of her Della Cruscan style when she wrote Poems by Mary Robinson, published in 1791 by J. Bell in London, and Poems by Mrs. Robinson, published in 1793 by T. Spilsbury in London. A review was written by the Gentleman's Magazine and the reviewer stated that if Robinson had been less blessed with "beauty and captivating manners","her poetical taste might have been confined in its influence". At the end of the review, "the Gentleman's Magazine describes her poetry as elegant and harmonious.

In 1795, Robinson wrote a satirical poem titled London's Summer Morning, but it was published after her death in 1800. This poem showcased Robinson's critical perspective of the infrastructure and society of London. Robinson described the busy and loud sounds of the industrialised city in the morning. She employed characters such as the chimney-boy, and ruddy housemaid to make a heavy critique on the way English society treated children as both innocent and fragile creatures.

In 1796, Robinson argued for women's rationality, their right to education and illustrated ideas of free will, suicide, rationalisation, empiricism and relationship to sensibility in Sappho and Phaon: In a Series of Legitimate Sonnets.

During the 1790s, Robinson was highly inspired by feminism and desired to spread her liberal sentiments through her writing. She was an ardent admirer of Mary Wollstonecraft, an established and influential feminist writer of the period. But to Robinson’s surprise, her intense feelings were not reciprocated by Wollstonecraft. While Robinson expected a strong friendship between the two of them to flourish, Wollstonecraft “found Robinson herself considerably less appealing than the title character of Angelina”. In 1796, Wollstonecraft wrote an extremely harsh review of Robinson's work in the Analytical Review. It was this critique that was not critical, or well thought out. Instead, Wollstonecraft's review of Robinson proved to be relatively shallow and pointed at her jealousy of Robinson's comparable freedom. Wollstonecraft had the potential to spend more of her own time writing, instead of having to entertain her husband, William Goodwin. Robinson's "Letter to the Women of England against Mental Subordination" is still powerful reading. Robinson reiterates the rights women have to live by sexual passion.

Lastly, in 1800, after years of failing health and decline into financial ruin, Robinson wrote her last piece of literature during her lifetime: a series of poems titled the Lyrical Tales, published by Longman & Rees, in London. This poetry collection explored themes of domestic violence, misogyny, violence against destitute characters, and political oppression. “Robinson’s last work pleads for a recognition of the moral and rational worth of women: ‘Let me ask this plain and rational question-- is not woman a human being, gifted with all the feelings that inhabit the bosom of man?". Robinson's main objective was to respond to Lyrical Ballads written by authors Wordsworth and Coleridge; who were not as well known at the time. Although it was not as highly praised as Mary Wollstonecraft's "A Vindication of the Rights of Woman", published in 1792, Lyrical Tales provides a “powerful critique of the division of duties and privileges between the sexes. It places Robinson firmly on the side of the ‘feminist’ thinkers or ‘modern’ philosophers of the 1790s, as one of the strong defenders of her sex".

Criticism and reception 
Robinson was known as a sexualised celebrity, but she was a very talented writer. Robinson did not receive recognition for her work until much later because of "strict attitudes led to a rejection of the literary work of such a notorious woman." She became a lesson to young girls about the dangers of promiscuity, and pleasure seeking. She was named by her friend Samuel Taylor Coleridge "as a woman of undoubted genius." The collection of Poems published in 1791 had a "subscription list of 600 people was headed by His Royal Highness, George, Prince of Wales, and included many other members of the nobility. Some people subscribed because of her writing, some because of her notoriety, and some perhaps out of pity for the former actress, now crippled and ill. Reviews were generally kind, and noted traces in her poems of a sensibility that would later be termed Romanticism." Twenty years after her death the Poetical Works of The Late Mrs. Robinson was published in 1824, which speaks to her ongoing popularity. Robinson's second novel The Widow, and in her controversial comedy Nobody: A Comedy in Two Acts both of which, according to newspaper reports, offended fashionable women. Needless to say, Robinson's playwright career was short-lived after all the bad reviews of her play. The upper class interpreted her satire as mockery on female gambling and it was an attack on moral legitimacy of the Whig elite. The upper class interpretation of Nobody reveals a great deal about the social and political anxieties during the revolutionary era.

Robinson's poems were popular, especially after she produced a variety of poems whilst working at the newspaper The Morning Post. The poetry columns had a double agenda of pleasing a substantial and diverse audience and shaping them into a select group of elite readers eager to buy and consume books. The public adored the novel Vancenza; or The Dangers of Credulity, but the critical reception was mixed. Furthermore, a biographer Paula Byrne recently dismissed it as a “product of the vogue for Gothic fiction [that] now seems overblown to the point of absurdity.” Although Robinson's poetry was more popular than her other works, the most lucrative "was her prose. The money helped to support herself, her mother and daughter, and often Banastre Tarleton. Novels such as Vancenza (1792), The Widow (1794), Angelina (1796), and Walsingham (1797) went through multiple editions and were often translated into French and German. They owed part of their popularity to their suspected autobiographical elements. Even when her characters were placed in scenes of gothic horror, their views could be related to the experiences of their author."

Mary Robinson was one of the first female celebrities of the modern era. She was dubbed as scandalous, but on the other hand educated and able to be partially independent from her husband. She was one of the first women to enter the sphere of writing, and to be successful there. Scholars often argue that she used her celebrity status only in her own advantage, but it is to be noted how much she contributed to the awareness of early feminism. She tried to elaborate the ideas of equality for women in England during the late 18th century. Nevertheless, many contemporary women were not amused with how she exposed herself to the public and ostracised her. They did not want to be associated with her, since they feared to receive a bad reputation sympathising with Mary Robinson.

Works

Poetry 

 Poems by Mrs. Robinson (London: C. Parker, 1775) Digital Edition 
 Captivity, a Poem and Celadon and Lydia, a Tale. Dedicated, by Permission, to Her Grace the Duchess of Devonshire. (London: T. Becket, 1777)
 Ainsi va le Monde, a Poem. Inscribed to Robert Merry, Esq. A.M. [Laura Maria] (London: John Bell, 1790) Digital Edition
 Poems by Mrs. M. Robinson (London: J. Bell, 1791) Digital Edition
 The Beauties of Mrs. Robinson (London: H. D. Symonds, 1791)
 Monody to the Memory of Sir Joshua Reynolds, Late President of the Royal Academy, &c. &c. &c. (London: J. Bell, 1792)
 Ode to the Harp of the Late Accomplished and Amiable Louisa Hanway (London: John Bell, 1793)
 Modern Manners, a Poem. In Two Cantos. By Horace Juvenal (London: Printed for the Author, 1793)
 Sight, the Cavern of Woe, and Solitude. Poems (London: T. Spilsbury and Son, 1793)
 Monody to the Memory of the Late Queen of France (London: T. Spilsbury and Son, 1793) 
 Poems by Mrs. M. Robinson. Volume the Second (London: T. Spilsbury and Son, 1793)
 Poems, by Mrs. Mary Robinson. A New Edition (London: T. Spilsbury, 1795)
 Sappho and Phaon. In a Series of Legitimate Sonnets, with Thoughts on Poetical Subjects, and Anecdotes of the Grecian Poetess (London: For the Author, 1796) Digital Edition   
 Lyrical Tales, by Mrs. Mary Robinson (London: T. N. Longman and O. Rees, 1800) Digital Edition
 The Mistletoe. --- A Christmas Tale [Laura Maria] (London: Laurie & Whittle, 1800)

Novels 
 Vancenza; or, the Dangers of Credulity. In Two Volumes (London: Printed for the Authoress, 1792)
 The Widow, or a Picture of Modern Times. A Novel, in a Series of Letters, in Two Volumes (London: Hookham and Carpenter, 1794)
 Angelina; a Novel, in Three Volumes (London: Printed for the Author, 1796)
 Hubert de Sevrac, a Romance, of the Eighteenth Century (London: Printed for the Author, 1796)
 Walsingham; or, the Pupil of Nature. A Domestic Story (London: T. N. Longman, 1797)
 The False Friend: a Domestic Story (London: T. N. Longman and O. Rees, 1799)
 Natural Daughter. With Portraits of the Leadenhead Family]. A Novel (London: T. N. Longman and O. Rees, 1799)

Dramas 
 The Lucky Escape, A Comic Opera (performed on 23 April 1778 at the Theatre Royal, Drury Lane)
 The Songs, Chorusses, &c. in The Lucky Escape, a Comic Opera, as Performed at the Theatre-Royal, in Drury-Lane (London: Printed for the Author, 1778)
 Kate of Aberdeen (a comic opera withdrawn in 1793 and never staged)
 Nobody. A Comedy in Two Acts (performed on 27 Nov. 1794 at the Theatre Royal, Drury Lane) Digital Edition
 The Sicilian Lover. A Tragedy. In Five Acts (London: Printed for the Author, 1796)

Political Treatises 

 Impartial Reflections on the Present Situation of the Queen of France; by A Friend to Humanity (London: John Bell, 1791)
 A Letter to the Women of England, on the Injustice of Mental Subordination. With Anecdotes. By Anne Frances Randall] (London: T. N. Longman and O. Rees, 1799) Digital Edition
 Thoughts on the Condition of Women, and on the Injustice of Mental Subordination (London: T. N. Longman and O. Rees, 1799)

Essays 

 “The Sylphid. No. I,” Morning Post and Gazetteer 29 Oct. 1799: 2 (also printed in Memoirs 3: 3–8)
 “The Sylphid. No. II,” Morning Post and Gazetteer 7 Nov. 1799: 2 (also printed in Memoirs 3: 8–16)
 “The Sylphid. No. III,” Morning Post and Gazetteer 16 Nov. 1799: 3 (also printed in Memoirs 3: 17–21)
 “The Sylphid. No. IV,” Morning Post and Gazetteer 23 Nov. 1799: 2 (edited version printed in Memoirs 3: 21–26)
 “The Sylphid. No. V,” Morning Post and Gazetteer 27 Nov. 1799: 2 (also printed in Memoirs 3: 27–31)
 “The Sylphid. No. VI,” Morning Post and Gazetteer 7 Dec. 1799: 2 (edited version printed in Memoirs 3: 31–35)
 “The Sylphid. No. VII,” Morning Post and Gazetteer 19 Dec. 1799: 2 (also printed in Memoirs 3: 35–40)
 “The Sylphid. No. VIII,” Morning Post and Gazetteer 24 Dec. 1799: 2 (also printed in Memoirs 3: 41–45)
 “The Sylphid. No. IX,” Morning Post and Gazetteer 2 Jan. 1800: 3 (also printed as No. XIV in Memoirs 3: 74–80)
 “To the Sylphid,” Morning Post and Gazetteer 4 Jan. 1800: 3 (also printed as No. IX in Memoirs 3: 46–50)
 “The Sylphid. No. X,” Morning Post and Gazetteer 7 Jan. 1800: 3 (also printed in Memoirs 3: 51–57)
 “The Sylphid. No. XI,” Morning Post and Gazetteer 11 Jan. 1800: 2 (also printed in Memoirs 3: 58–63)
 “The Sylphid. No. XII,” Morning Post and Gazetteer 31 Jan. 1800: 2 (edited version printed in Memoirs 3: 63–68)
 “The Sylphid. No. XIII,” Memoirs 3: 68-73 (no extant copy of Morning Post exists)
 “Present State of the Manners, Society, &c. &c. of the Metropolis of England,” Monthly Magazine 10 (Aug. 1800): 35–38.
 “Present State of the Manners, Society, &c. &c. of the Metropolis of England,” Monthly Magazine 10 (Sept. 1800): 138-40
 “Present State of the Manners, Society, &c. &c. of the Metropolis of England,” Monthly Magazine 10 (Oct. 1800): 218-22
 “Present State of the Manners, Society, &c. &c. of the Metropolis of England,” Monthly Magazine 10 (Oct. 1800): 305-06

Translation 

 Picture of Palermo by Dr. Hager translated from the German by Mrs. Mary Robinson (London: R. Phillips, 1800)

Biographical Sketches 

 “Anecdotes of Eminent Persons: Memoirs of the Late Duc de Biron,” Monthly Magazine 9 (Feb.1800): 43-46
 “Anecdotes of Eminent Persons: Account of Rev. John Parkhurst,” Monthly Magazine 9 (July 1800): 560-61
 “Anecdotes of Eminent Persons: Account of Bishop Parkhurst,” Monthly Magazine 9 (July 1800): 561
 “Anecdotes of Eminent Persons: Additional Anecdotes of Philip Egalité Late Duke of Orleans,” Monthly Magazine 10 (Aug. 1800): 39-40
 “Anecdotes of Eminent Persons: Anecdotes of the Late Queen of France,” Monthly Magazine 10 (Aug. 1800): 40-41

Posthumous Publications 
 “Mr. Robert Ker Porter.” Public Characters of 1800-1801 (London: R. Phillips, 1801)
 Memoirs of the Late Mrs. Robinson, Written by Herself with Some Posthumous Pieces. In Four Volumes (London: R. Phillips, 1801)
 “Jasper. A Fragment,” Memoirs of the Late Mrs. Robinson, Vol. 3 (London: R. Phillips, 1801)
 “The Savage of Aveyron,” Memoirs of the Late Mrs. Robinson, Vol. 3 (London: R. Phillips, 1801)
 “The Progress of Liberty,” Memoirs of the Late Mrs. Robinson, Vol. 4 (London: R. Phillips, 1801)
 The Poetical Works of the Late Mrs. Mary Robinson: Including Many Pieces Never Before Published. In Three Volumes (London: Richard Phillips, 1806)

Publications about Robinson and Her Work

Biographies (Ordered by Date of Publication) 

 “A Tribute of Respect to the Memory of the Late Mrs. Robinson, in the Form of a Monumental Inscription.” Weekly Entertainer 37 (June 1801): 517. 
 “Mrs. Robinson.” Public Characters of 1800-1801. London: R. Phillips, 1801. 327–37. 
 Jones, Stephen. “Robinson (Mary).” A New Biographical Dictionary: Containing a Brief Account of the Life and Writings of the Most Eminent Persons and Remarkable Characters in Every Age and Nation. 5th ed. London: Longman, Hurst, Rees and Orne; J. Wallis; W. Peacock and Sons; J. Harris; Scatcherd and Letterman; Vernor and Hood; and J. Walker, 1805. N. pag.
 “Biographical Sketch of Mrs. Mary Robinson.” The Hibernia Magazine, and Dublin Monthly Panorama 3 (1811): 25–28. 
 
 Craven, Mary. Famous Beauties of Two Reigns; Being an Account of Some Fair Women of Stuart & Georgian Times. London: E. Nash, 1906. 
 Fyvie, John. Comedy Queens of the Georgian Era. New York: E.P. Dutton, 1907. 
 Makower, Stanley. Perdita: A Romance in Biography. London: Hutchinson, 1908. 
 
 Barrington, E. [Lily Adams Beck]. The Exquisite Perdita. New York: Dodd, Mead and Company, 1926. 
 Benjamin, Lewis S. More Stage Favorites of the Eighteenth Century. Freeport, NY: Books for Libraries Press, Inc, 1929.
 Mendenhall, John C. “Mary Robinson (1758-1800).” University of Pennsylvania Library Chronicle 4 (1936): 2–10. 
 Steen, Marguerite. The Lost One, a Biography of Mary (Perdita) Robinson. London: Methuen & Co., 1937. 
 Bass, Robert D. The Green Dragoon: The Lives of Banastre Tarleton and Mary Robinson. New York: Henry Hold and Company, 1957.
 Ty, Eleanor. "Mary Robinson." In British Reform Writers, 1789-1832, edited by Gary Kelly, 297–305. Detroit: Thomson Gale, 1995.
 Levy, Martin J. "Mrs. Robinson." The Mistresses of King George IV. London: P. Owen, 1996. 13–43.
 Meyers, Kate Beaird. “Mary Darby Robinson (‘Perdita’).” An Encyclopedia of British Women Writers. Eds. Paul and June Schleuter. Rev. and Expanded. New Brunswick: Rutgers UP, 1998. 391-92.
 Schlueter, Paul, and June Schlueter. “Mary Robinson.” An Encyclopedia of British Women Writers. New Brunswick: Rutgers UP, 1998. 
 Pascoe, Judith, ed. "Introduction." Mary Robinson: Selected Poems. Peterborough, ON: Broadview Press, 2000.
 Binhammer, Katherine. "Mary Darby Robinson (1758–1800)." Female Spectator 4.3 (2000): 2–4.
 Byrne, Paula. Perdita: The Literary, Theatrical, and Scandalous Life of Mary Robinson. New York: Random House, 2004.
 Davenport, Hester. The Prince’s Mistress: Perdita, a Life of Mary Robinson. Stroud: Sutton Publishing, 2004.
 Denlinger, Elizabeth Campbell. Before Victoria: Extraordinary Women of the British Romantic Era. New York: New York Public Library: Columbia University Press, 2005. 
 Gristwood, Sarah. Perdita: Royal Mistress, Writer, Romantic. London: Bantam, 2005.
 Gristwood, Sarah. Bird of Paradise: The Colourful Career of the First Mrs Robinson. London: Bantam, 2007. 
 Brewer, William D., ed. The Works of Mary Robinson. 8 vols. Pickering & Chatto, 2009–2010.
 Davenport, Hester, Ed. “‘Sketch of Mrs Robinson’s Life by Herself.’” In The Works of Mary Robinson, edited by William D. Brewer, 7: 333-35. London: Pickering and Chatto, 2010.
 Perry, Gill, Joseph Roach, and Shearer West. “Mary Robinson: Born in 1756/8 – Died in 1800.” In The First Actresses: Nell Gwyn to Sarah Siddons. Ann Arbor: University of Michigan Press, 2011. 55.

Selected Resources on Robinson and Her Work 

 Barron, Phillip. “'Who Has Not Wak'd': Mary Robinson and Cartesian Poetry.” Philosophy and Literature 41.2 (2017): 392–399.
 Brewer, William D., ed. The Works of Mary Robinson. 8 vols. Pickering & Chatto, 2009–2010.
 Cross, Ashley. Mary Robinson and the Genesis of Romanticism: Literary Dialogues and Debts, 1784-1821. London: Routledge, 2016.
 Gamer, Michael, and Terry F. Robinson. “Mary Robinson and the Dramatic Art of the Comeback.” Studies in Romanticism 48.2 (Summer 2009): 219–256.
 Ledoux, Ellen Malenas. “Florizel and Perdita Affair, 1779–80.” BRANCH: Britain, Representation and Nineteenth-Century History. Ed. Dino Franco Felluga. Extension of Romanticism and Victorianism on the Net. Web. 2 June 2013.
 Pascoe, Judith. Mary Robinson: Selected Poems. Peterborough, ON: Broadview Press, 1999.
 Robinson, Daniel. The Poetry of Mary Robinson: Form and Fame. New York: Palgrave Macmillan, 2011.
 Robinson, Terry F. "Introduction." Nobody. By Mary Robinson. Romantic Circles. Web. March 2013.
 Robinson, Terry F. "Becoming Somebody: Refashioning the Body Politic in Mary Robinson's Nobody." Studies in Romanticism 55 (Summer 2016): 143–184.

Fictional Works about Robinson 

 Plaidy, Jean. Perdita's Prince. 1969.
 Elyot, Amanda. All For Love: The Scandalous Life and Times of Royal Mistress Mary Robinson. A Novel. 2008.
 Lightfoot, Freda. Lady of Passion: The Story of Mary Robinson. 2013.

Notes

References
Binhammer, Katherine. 'Thinking Gender with Sexuality in 1790s Feminist Thought.' Feminist Studies 28.3 (2002): 667–90.
Byrne, Paula (2005). Perdita: The Life of Mary Robinson. London: HarperCollins and New York: Random House.
Gristwood, Sarah (2005). Perdita: royal mistress, writer, romantic. London: Bantam.
 
Robinson, Mary, and Mary Elizabeth Robinson (1801). Memoirs of the Late Mrs. Robinson. London: Printed by Wilkes and Taylor for R. Phillips.
Mary Darby Robinson biography
Mary Robinson memoirs

External links 

 Mary Robinson at the Eighteenth-Century Poetry Archive (ECPA)

 
 
 
 Portrait of Mary Robinson by Gainsborough The Guardian, 26 August 2000
Mary Robinson profile Contemporary obituaries and death notices Tarleton site

English women poets
Mary
Mistresses of George IV of the United Kingdom
1757 births
1800 deaths
Actresses from Bristol
18th-century British women writers
English women novelists
Writers of the Romantic era
English stage actresses
English courtesans
English feminists
18th-century English actresses
English women dramatists and playwrights
18th-century English novelists
18th-century English poets
18th-century British dramatists and playwrights